Abraham Klausner was an Austrian rabbi and ritualist who flourished at Vienna in the second half of the fourteenth century.

He shared the rabbinical office at Vienna with Meir ben Baruch Halevi (Jacob Weil, Responsa, No. 151).

Two of his pupils were Isaac Tyrnau and Jacob Mölln. His collection of ritual customs ("minhagim"), with his notes, was published at Riva di Trento in 1559. The editor of Mölln's "Minhage Maharil" added in several cases some of the minhagim collected by Klausner. His responsa are referred to by Israel Isserlein in his "Pesaḳim u-Ketabim" (No. 6).

References 

14th-century Austrian rabbis
Place of birth unknown
Place of death unknown
Rabbis from Vienna
Year of birth unknown
Year of death unknown